Threshold House is one of several record labels created by Coil to release their own work and that of affiliated projects. Associated labels include Eskaton and Chalice. It is also the name for the official Coil website.

The label was initially a vanity label of sorts, as all releases were manufactured and distributed by other labels, most prominently World Serpent Distribution. Following the bankruptcy of World Serpent, the label continued independently.

The logo for Threshold House is a castle-like building, possibly what Coil have referred to as "The East Tower" in past interviews, and a moon. It is also very similar to artist recreations of the buildings at Catalhoyuk.

After the death of John Balance and the disbanding of Coil, Peter Christopherson started a solo effort, The Threshold HouseBoys Choir, based on the name Threshold House.

Releases

LOCI
The series of "LOCI" were released when Coil resided in England.

THRESH & THBKK
The "THRESH" and "THBKK" series began with Peter Christopherson's relocation to Bangkok, Thailand.

See also
 List of record labels
 List of electronic music record labels

References

External links
 Threshold House

Electronic music record labels
Vanity record labels
British record labels
Record labels established in 1987